Scott Ronald Dixon  (born 22 July 1980) is a New Zealand racing driver who races the  9 Chip Ganassi Racing (CGR) Dallara DW12-Honda car in the IndyCar Series. He is a six-time drivers' champion of the IndyCar Series, having claimed the title in 2003, 2008, 2013, 2015, 2018 and 2020 and he won the 2008 Indianapolis 500 with CGR. Dixon has three 24 Hours of Daytona victories, with CGR in 2006 and 2015 and in 2020 with Wayne Taylor Racing.

He began karting at age seven and won 30 major karting titles in his age group across Australia and New Zealand. Aged 13, Dixon progressed to car racing, winning the 1994 New Zealand Formula Vee Championship, the 1996 New Zealand Formula Ford Class II Championship, the 1998 Australian Drivers' Championship and the 2000 Indy Lights. He debuted in Championship Auto Racing Teams (CART) in 2001 with the PacWest Racing team and won his first major open-wheel race in his third series start before joining CGR in 2002 when PacWest folded due to financial difficulties. Dixon and CGR moved to the IndyCar Series in 2003, winning the title in his debut season with three victories. Following a winless 2004 season, he won one race in the 2005, finished fourth in the 2006 with two victories, and finished second to Dario Franchitti in 2007 with four wins. Dixon won his second IndyCar championship in 2008, with five victories (including the Indianapolis 500).

He finished second to teammate Franchitti in the 2009 season, breaking Sam Hornish Jr.'s all-time series wins record, and third in each season from 2010 to 2012. Dixon won his third series championship with four victories in 2013, and finished third overall with two victories the following season. In 2015, he won his fourth IndyCar championship, tying teammate Juan Pablo Montoya on points but being declared series champion due to a count-back on the number of victories taken by both drivers. During the 2016 and 2017 season, Dixon's form lowered but he took three wins to finish sixth and third overall, respectively. His three victories during the 2018 season earned him his fifth series championship, and he went on to win his sixth title two years later with four victories. After finishing fourth overall with one victory in 2021, Dixon improved on his performance with two wins for third in the points standings in 2022.

Overall he has won 53 races in American open-wheel car racing and finished on the podium 133 times. Since 2004, Dixon has also competed in endurance racing in the American Le Mans Series, the Rolex Sports Car Series, the IMSA SportsCar Championship and the 24 Hours of Le Mans as well the International Race of Champions and V8 Supercars. He was named New Zealand's Sportsman of the Year in both 2008 and 2013. Dixon was made a Member of the New Zealand Order of Merit in 2009 and a Companion of the New Zealand Order of Merit (CNZM) a decade later.

Early and personal life
Dixon was born in Brisbane, Australia on 22 July 1980, the youngest child and only son of middle-class New Zealand expatriates Ron and Glenys Dixon. He has two older sisters. Although he was born in Australia, Dixon holds New Zealand citizenship. Dixon's parents raced various types of cars on various circuits, and owned a dirt speedway in Townsville, North Queensland. The family moved to Australia in 1976 in search of better opportunities, settling in Townsville before returning to Auckland, New Zealand a decade later after a major accident involving his father. Dixon attended Manurewa Central Primary, Green Meadows Intermediate and James Cook High School. He married former British and Welsh 800 metres champion and television presenter Emma Davies-Dixon in February 2008. They have three children.

Early racing career

Aged seven, Dixon began racing go-karts after watching his cousins race at Auckland's Mt. Wellington oval kart track and tried karting following the conclusion of a raceday. He was encouraged by his parents to pursue a racing career, and was first put into a midget car with a Ironhorse engine at age eight. Dixon was influenced by the success of New Zealand drivers Chris Amon, Denny Hulme and Bruce McLaren. Over the next six years, Dixon parents purchased additional equipment depending on circumstances and Dixon's increase in achievements. His father worked long hours importing Omega karts and cars from Japan, to finance his son's endeavours and borrowed so much money he did not inform his wife about all of it. During the following five years, Dixon won 30 major Australian and New Zealand-based karting championships in his age group, including the 1992 New Zealand Junior Restricted Championship. 

Aged 13, he began car racing, earning dispensation from Motorsport NZ to obtain a junior competition licence to enter club and national level events in categories up to Formula Ford after lobbying by his parents. Dixon took the 1994 New Zealand Formula Vee Championship at his first attempt to become its youngest champion; He was second in the 1994 New Zealand Formula Class II Championship, and drove the 1994 NZRDC Formula Ford Winter Series. Dixon rolled a Nissan Sentra saloon car onto its roof during a race at Pukekohe Park Raceway, capturing national attention when footage showed him struggling from the upturned car with a cushion strapped to his back to reach the pedals. For the 1995–1996 season, he drove a 1600cc light, low-downforce pushrod open-wheel car in the higher-tier New Zealand Formula Ford Class II Championship, winning the category title with 13 victories in 14 events. Dixon's family moved him to the primary Formula Ford class in a 1992 Swift car, securing the 1996–1997 title with 8 wins from 15 starts.

With no help from Motorsport NZ, Dixon's family approached open-wheel racer Ken Smith, who became Dixon's manager and mentor in their plan to send him to the Australian Drivers' Championship's Formula Holden class. Dixon got race-by-race funding from sponsors and individuals as his family and a small group of local sponsors lost funding. He finished the 14-race series third in the under-powered 1991 Ralt Australia Reynard 91D–Holden car, and was named Rookie of the Year. Dixon initially found it difficult to communicate with team owner Graham Watson because he was not a family member; his school recommended he stop schooling due to his good academic performance and focus on racing. 

To fund his 1998 campaign, investors formed the Scott Dixon Motor Sport (SDMS) company to raise enough money to support Dixon's career until a top-team signed him, and allowed him to be paid a salary. He was not allowed to access the Australian Institute of Sport for fitness and media training since he was not an Australian citizen. Driving the 1992 SH Racing Reynard 92D–Holden car in the 12-round series, Dixon achieved five wins, five second-places and seven pole positions to claim the Australian Gold Star Drivers' Championship, after a season-long duel with future V8 Supercars racer Todd Kelly. He also finished second in the New Zealand Grand Prix.

In late 1998, he moved to the United States and entered the Championship Auto Racing Teams' (CART) developmental series Indy Lights, hoping to reach Formula One (F1) because SDMS could not afford the more expensive European series such as British Formula 3 with Alan Docking Racing. SDMS approached Tasman Motorsports owner Steve Horne but was unable to secure enough sponsorship for Dixon to drive for the team, so Dixon was tested by Johansson Motorsports (JM) at Sebring International Raceway. Dixon raced for the team in the 1999 season after legal negotiations with SDMS and additional sponsorship funding. He underwent intensive training in a weighted helmet to strengthen his neck muscles to combat g-forces. Dixon finished fifth in the drivers' championship in a Lola T97/20-Buick car, with one victory and four top-five finishes, and was second to Jonny Kane in the Rookie of the Year standings. In October 1999, he tested a Formula 3000 car for the Gauloises Junior Team in France, and two months later, finished second in the New Zealand Grand Prix.

After Smith left Dixon's management team post-season, JM team owner Stefan Johansson became Dixon's manager, deciding if Dixon could not progress to CART in the 2001 season, Dixon would join another team. After seeing Dixon compete in Australia, media manager Brett Murray encouraged PacWest Racing's (PWR) Indy Lights development squad to employ him for the 2000 championship. Dixon accepted following SDMS' decision not to engage in direct contract talks, finalising a five-year contract with 15 days minimum testing with its CART team in April 2000. He won the title with 155 points, six victories and eight top-four finishes, becoming the series' second-youngest title winner behind Greg Moore.

CART (2001–2002)

Dixon debuted in CART in 2001, replacing the retired Mark Blundell in PWR's No. 18 Reynard 01I–Toyota car. His team encouraged him to gain weight before the season began, and he trained with teammate Maurício Gugelmin; he was concerned about acclimating to the longer CART races and developing race strategies. Dixon won the Lehigh Valley Grand Prix at Nazareth Speedway on his third career start, driving 116 laps without stopping for fuel, becoming the youngest winner of a major open-wheel race at the age of 20 years, 9 months, and 14 days. He added another top-three finish at Milwaukee Mile and three fourth-place finishes at Chicago Motor Speedway, Road America and Laguna Seca, finishing eighth in the drivers' championship with 98 points and winning the Rookie of the Year award.

Dixon returned to the renamed PWR Championship Racing in the 2002 season, with the team switching manufacturers from Reynard to a Lola B02/00-Toyota. Dixon purposefully did not sign a long-term contract with the team so that he could switch to F1 if he impressed teams during testing. Following his two top-ten finishes at Monterrey and Motegi in the first three races, financial trouble forced PWR to disband. This prompted Chip Ganassi Racing (CGR) to sign Dixon to drive its third car for the rest of the season after discussions with his family, team owner Chip Ganassi, and engine manufacturer Toyota during preparations for the Indianapolis 500. Dixon became compatible with his teammates Bruno Junqueira and Kenny Bräck and had to learn about CGR's expectations. The rest of the season saw him achieve nine top-ten finishes including a season-best second at the Grand Prix of Denver late in the year. Dixon finished 13th in the final drivers' championship standings with 97 points.

IndyCar Series (2003–present)

2003–2006 
Dixon and CGR switched from CART to the IndyCar Series before the 2003 season, partly due to financial incentives and a desire to compete in the Indianapolis 500. Although he was hesitant to participate in the all-oval track series because he was a road course specialist, he quickly adapted to ovals. Dixon won his debut race, the Toyota Indy 300 at Homestead–Miami Speedway, after leading the final 53 laps. He sustained injuries in an accident with Tony Kanaan at Motegi two races later. At his first Indianapolis 500, he qualified fourth; late in the race, he lost control of his car and spun through 180 degrees, finishing 17th. Dixon took successive wins at Pikes Peak International Raceway and Richmond International Raceway and four second places in the next ten races. He entered the season-ending Chevy 500 at Texas Motor Speedway as one of five title contenders and tied on points with Team Penske's Hélio Castroneves, requiring a victory to win the championship. Dixon finished second, ahead of all other title contenders, to win the championship with 507 points.

In the second round of the 2004 championship, he finished second at Phoenix International Raceway, followed by a fifth-place finish in the following round at Motegi. The remaining twelve races saw him achieve seven more top-tens with his best performance during that period being a fifth place in the final round, the Chevy 500 at Texas, for tenth overall with 355 points. His Toyota engine lacked power, causing him to be slower than drivers racing better developed Honda engines, particularly when IndyCar implemented a rule change lowering engine sizes from 3.5 L to 3.0 L at the Indianapolis 500. Dixon, according to Smith, would occasionally overdrive his car, causing handling issues entering corners.

Dixon stayed at CGR for the 2005 season after signing a contract extension to stay in IndyCar until the conclusion of the 2006 championship in May 2004. He had implants installed in the corner of his left eye to restore it to optimal sight for oval circuits, and focused fully on IndyCar following F1 testing for the Williams team in Europe and racing in the International Race of Champions (IROC) early the previous year. The beginning of the year saw him struggle in comparison with his previous two years in IndyCar with CGR. At the Indianapolis 500, he qualified in 13th position but a lap 114 two-car accident with Richie Hearn saw him finish 24th. At Watkins Glen for the Watkins Glen Indy Grand Prix, Dixon led a event-high 25 laps for his first series victory in 40 races. He finished 13th in the drivers' championship with 321 points. 

CGR switched from the underpowered Toyota engine to the more powerful Honda engine for the 2006 season after Toyota left IndyCar to focus on NASCAR and the ubiquitous Dallara chassis. He concentrated on improving his abilities on oval tracks, and learnt from teammate Dan Wheldon how to improve his performance on  ovals. Dixon began 2006 with consecutive second-places in St. Petersburg and Motegi. He qualified fourth for the Indianapolis 500 and battled for the lead until he was imposed a drive-through penalty for blocking Kanaan, causing him to finish sixth. Dixon then won the following wet-weather Watkins Glen Indy Grand Prix, his fifth career victory, after passing Buddy Rice with nine laps left. He went on to achieve victory in the Firestone Indy 200 at Nashville Speedway four races later by 0.1176 seconds over Wheldon after leading the final 67 laps. Going into the season-ending Peak Antifreeze Indy 300 at Chicagoland Speedway, Dixon was one of four drivers mathematically eligible win the championship; however, he finished second and was fourth overall with 460 points.

2007–2010 

Dixon began the 2007 season with two podium finishes and two fourth places within the first four rounds before qualifying fourth for the Indianapolis 500 and finishing the rain-shortened race second. He won three consecutive races at Watkins Glen, Nashville and Mid-Ohio, tying a series record set by Bräck in the 1998 season and Wheldon in the 2005 championship, lowering Dario Franchitti's points advantage from 65 to 24. Dixon won the Motorola Indy 300 at Sonoma three rounds later, passing Franchitti's damaged car late in the race to take the championship lead from the latter. He was second overall with three fewer points than Franchitti going into the season-ending Peak Antifreeze Indy 300 in Chicago, and one of three competitors who could mathematically claim the drivers' championship. Late on the race's final lap, Dixon was leading when his car ran out of fuel, causing him to finish runner-up to Franchitti with 624 points.

The 2008 season saw Dixon return to CGR, winning the season-opening Gainsco Auto Insurance Indy 300 at Homestead from pole position. After two third-places at Motegi and Kansas Speedway (from pole position), his season highlight was winning the Indianapolis 500 for the first (and only) time in his career, leading 115 laps from pole position. Dixon won the Bombardier Learjet 550 from pole position two races later in Texas, and then the rain-shortened Firestone Indy 200 in Nashville. He achieved consecutive wins in the Rexall Edmonton Indy at Edmonton City Centre Airport and the Meijer Indy 300 at Kentucky in which he led 151 laps from pole position after Castroneves ran out of fuel on the final lap. Dixon led Castroneves by 30 championship points entering the season-ending Peak Antifreeze Indy 300; he won his second series title after finishing 0.0033 seconds behind race winner Castroneves in the series' second-closest finish.

For his title defence in the 2009 season, Dixon raced for CGR. Following two subpar races, he led 134 laps to win the season's third round, the RoadRunner Turbo Indy 300 at Kansas. Dixon won the ABC Supply Company A.J. Foyt 225 at Milwaukee for the championship lead two races later. At Richmond for the SunTrust Indy Challenge, he led 161 laps in his third victory of 2009, equalling Sam Hornish Jr.'s series record career wins with his 19th. Following his finishes at Watkins Glen and Edmonton, Dixon won his season's fourth race in the Honda 200 at Mid-Ohio, breaking Hornish's all-time victory record. His fifth and final victory of 2009 was the Indy Japan 300 at Motegi, leading 139 laps from pole position. Dixon entered the season-ending Firestone Indy 300 as one of three drivers eligible for the championship. With 605 points, he finished third in the race and was championship runner-up to teammate Franchitti.

Dixon's 2010 season began with three top-seven finishes in the first four races before leading 167 laps of the RoadRunner Turbo Indy 300 to win the event for the second consecutive year in Kansas. Following four top-eight finishes, he won the Honda Indy Edmonton after Castroneves was deemed to have blocked his Penske teammate Will Power. Dixon finished no lower than eighth in the five rounds that followed, including a second-place finish at Sonoma Raceway. He was mathematically eliminated from winning the championship after finishing sixth in the Indy Japan 300 at Motegi, but he finished the season by winning the 2010 Cafés do Brasil Indy 300 at Homestead to finish third overall with 547 points.

2011–2015 

In the 2011 championship, Dixon again returned to drive for CGR. During the season's first eleven races, he finished in the top ten seven times, including second-place finishes at Barber Motorsports Park, the Texas doubleheader, and Toronto. Dixon won the Honda Indy 200 at Mid-Ohio for the third time after leading 50 laps from pole position. He led 62 laps of the Indy Japan: The Final at Motegi to win the event from pole position three races later. Dixon's third-place finish in the following Kentucky Indy 300 at Kentucky allowed him to beat Franchitti to the A. J. Foyt Oval Trophy despite having no oval victories in 2011. He was third in the Drivers' Championship with 518 points.

For the 2012 season, Dixon competed for CGR. engine reliability problems affected his performance that year. Three second-place finishes in the season's first five races came at St. Petersburg, Barber, and the Indianapolis 500. Dixon won the Chevrolet Detroit Belle Isle Grand Prix at The Raceway on Belle Isle after leading every lap from pole position. Six races later, he qualified fourth for the Honda Indy 200 at Mid-Ohio, where he won his second race of the season. Dixon was one of four drivers eligible for the drivers' championship after finishing fourth in the Grand Prix of Baltimore on the streets of Baltimore. He was 53 points behind championship leader Power. He finished third in the season-ending MAVTV 500 IndyCar World Championships at Auto Club Speedway for third overall with 435 points.

Dixon signed a three-year contract extension to remain at CGR for the 2013 season and through to the end of the 2015 championship in mid-2012. His Honda engined car had less power than Chevrolet engined vehicles. Dixon finished second at Barber and four other times in the season's first ten rounds. He started 17th in the Pocono IndyCar 400 at Pocono Raceway and held off teammate Charlie Kimball for his first victory of the season. Dixon won both races of the Honda Indy Toronto doubleheader (leading 81 laps in the second event from pole position) and moved into second place in the championship standings one week later. He won the first race of the Shell-Pennzoil Grand Prix of Houston doubleheader and finished second in the second race to overtake Castroneves (who had mechanical issues) as the season-ending MAVTV 500 IndyCar World Championships at Auto Club Speedway approached. Dixon won his third series title with 577 points after finishing fifth at Auto Club.

Dixon drove a Chevrolet-powered car for the first time in the 2014 season, after CGR switched from Honda to have both the IndyCar and NASCAR teams partnered with the same engine manufacturer.. His engines had a power delivery issue that slightly exaggerated shock/damper setup issues, and changes in centre of gravity and weight distribution caused traction issues exiting corners, requiring him to accelerate more cautiously. Dixon finished third once at Barber and had seven top-ten finishes in the first fourteen races of the season before winning the Honda Indy 200 at Mid-Ohio after starting 22nd. He overtook Mike Conway to win the GoPro Indy Grand Prix of Sonoma two races later. He finished third in the final championship standings with 604 points after finishing second in the season finale at Auto Club.

He returned to CGR for the 2015 season. Dixon qualified third for the season's third round, the Toyota Grand Prix of Long Beach and led 44 laps to claim his first win at the event. He took pole position for the Indianapolis 500 and led 84 laps before finishing fourth due to a lack of speed late in the race. Dixon started seventh in the Firestone 600 at Texas three races later and led 97 laps in his second victory of the season. He finished fifth five times in the next six races, including a pole position at the Iowa race. Dixon was one of six drivers vying for the championship heading into the season-ending GoPro Grand Prix of Sonoma, securing the race victory and his fourth championship title. Although he and Penske driver Juan Pablo Montoya had the same number of points (556), the tie was broken by wins; Dixon won three races and Montoya two.

2016–2020 
He drove for CGR in the 2016 season after signing a three-year contract extension with the team in mid-2015 and was outperformed by Penske engineering-wise. Dixon started seventh and led the final 155 laps of the Desert Diamond West Valley Phoenix Grand Prix at Phoenix International Raceway for his first win of the season, breaking a series record for wins in consecutive seasons with 12. Dixon had eight top-ten in the next twelve races after failing to finish three races due to unreliability and one in the Honda Indy 200 at Mid-Ohio due to an accident with Castroneves and qualifying on pole position for the race at Toronto. He won the IndyCar Grand Prix at The Glen after starting on pole and leading 50 laps. With 477 points after finishing 17th in the season finale at Sonoma, he finished sixth in the Drivers' Championship, the first time he finished outside the top three in points since 2005.

CGR returned to Honda engines before the 2017 season after three seasons with Chevrolet. Dixon finished third at St. Petersburg, Barber, and the Indianapolis road course in his first five races. He qualified on pole for the Indianapolis 500; during the race, he crashed airborne into the inside barrier after hitting Jay Howard's left-rear wheel on lap 53. Dixon and Howard were unhurt. He took the championship lead from Castroneves by finishing second in the first race of the Chevrolet Detroit Grand Prix doubleheader, and won the Kohler Grand Prix at Road America three races later. He finished no lower than tenth in the next six races, including consecutive second places at Gateway Motorsports Park and Watkins Glen, and was three points behind championship leader Josef Newgarden heading into the season-ending GoPro Grand Prix of Sonoma. Dixon finished fourth, putting him third in the final championship standings with 621 points.

He drove a car equipped with a new universal aerodynamic car package for the 2018 season and had no technical disadvantage to Penske. He took five top-ten finishes, including consecutive podiums at the Indianapolis road course and the Indianapolis 500 in the first six races. Dixon won the first race of the Chevrolet Detroit Grand Prix doubleheader after leading 39 laps, and he led the final 119 laps of the DXC Technology 600 at Texas for the championship lead two races later. Three races after Texas, he won his third and final race of 2018, the Honda Indy Toronto. Dixon finished no lower than fifth in the year's final five races and took pole position at Gateway. He won his fifth IndyCar championship finishing second in the season-ending Grand Prix of Sonoma, scoring 678 points.

Dixon signed a multi-year contract extension with CGR through to the end of the 2023 season after rejecting an offer from McLaren CEO Zak Brown to join the brand's IndyCar team for a rumoured three seasons before the 2019 championship. The season's first seven races yielded four podium finishes in St. Petersburg, Barber, Long Beach and the Indianapolis road course. Dixon won the second race of the hevrolet Detroit Grand Prix doubleheader after starting sixth. Following four top-five finishes, he held off teammate Felix Rosenqvist to win the Honda Indy 200 from eighth, his second and final victory of 2019 and sixth at Mid-Ohio. Dixon finished fourth in the final Drivers' Championship standings with 578 points after finishing on the podium twice more at Pocono and Laguna Seca.

The worldwide COVID-19 pandemic delayed and shortened the 2020 season to 14 events, and Indiana's lockdown required Dixon to prepare for the year at home. At the season-opening Genesys 300 round in Texas, he qualified second and led 157 of 200 laps, matching A. J. Foyt's record of 18 seasons with a victory. Dixon then won the GMR Grand Prix at the Indianapolis road course and the first race of the REV Group Grand Prix doubleheader at Road America. He took second in the first race of the Iowa doubleheader and led a race-high 111 laps in the Indianapolis 500. Dixon won his 50th career race in the opening round of the following Bommarito Automotive Group 500 doubleheader at Gateway. He finished no lower than tenth in the final five races, and won his sixth drivers' championship by 16 points over Newgarden in the season-ending Grand Prix of St. Petersburg, finishing third.

2021–present 

Dixon started the 2021 championship with a fifth-place finish at Barber and a third-place finish in St. Petersburg. He started third in the first race of the Genesys 300 doubleheader at Texas, leading 206 of 212 laps in his first and only victory of the year to take the championship lead and surpass Foyt's record of winning a race in the most seasons during his 19th season. Dixon then won two pole positions in the second Genesys 300 race and the Indianapolis 500, losing the championship lead to teammate Álex Palou. He finished the season with three more podiums and four top-ten finishes and was fourth in the final point standings with 481 points.

He finished in the top ten in each of the first five races of the 2022 season, with a best result of fifth place at Texas. He qualified on pole for the fifth time in the Indianapolis 500. Four races later, he started second in the Honda Indy Toronto and led 40 laps to claim his fourth Toronto victory. Dixon won the Big Machine Music City Grand Prix four races later on the streets of downtown Nashville. He was one of five drivers mathematically eligible to win the championship heading into the season finale, the Firestone Grand Prix of Monterey at Laguna Seca. A lack of speed in the race restricted him to 12th and he was fourth in the championship standings with 521 points.

Sports car career

Dixon made his endurance racing debut in the 1999 Petit Le Mans (part of the American Le Mans Series), retiring the No. 36 Ferrari 333 SP LMP class car he shared with Johansson and Jim Matthews due to gearbox problems. He competed in the 2004 24 Hours of Daytona (part of the Rolex Sports Car Series) with Jimmy Morales, Max Papis, and Scott Pruett, finishing sixth in class and tenth overall in CGR's No. 1 Riley MkXI-Lexus Daytona Prototype (DP). Dixon went on to finish third in the Lexus Grand American 400 alongside Darren Manning. The following year, he again drove the 24 Hours of Daytona in Chip Ganassi Racing with Felix Sabates' (CGRFS) No. 3 entry, finishing sixth with Manning and Casey Mears. Dixon, Mears and Wheldon won the 2006 24 Hours of Daytona, completing 734 laps in CGRFS' No. 2 Riley-Lexus. He finished fourth in the season-ending Discount Tire Sunchaser at Miller Motorsports Park, alongside co-drivers Luis Díaz and Pruett in the No. 1 entry.

Dixon entered the 24 Hours of Daytona with Memo Rojas and Wheldon in 2007, retiring after 538 laps when Rojas crashed the No. 2 car on the saturated track in the 21st hour for 21st in class and 41st overall. He raced alongside Salvador Durán, Alex Lloyd, and Wheldon in the 2008 24 Hours of Daytona, finishing 41st overall (18th in class) after 515 laps due to three crashes. Dixon finished fifth in class and eighth overall in De Ferran Motorsports' No. 66 Acura ARX-01b in the 2008 Petit Le Mans Le Mans Prototype 2 (LMP2) category alongside Gil de Ferran and Simon Pagenaud. He, Franchitti, Lloyd, and Pruett were fifth in the 2009 24 Hours of Daytona in CGRFS' No. 2 Riley-Lexus car. Dixon co-drove De Ferran Motorsports' No. 66 Acura ARX-02a Le Mans Prototype 1 (LMP1) car with De Ferran and Pagenaud in both the 12 Hours of Sebring and the Petit Le Mans. He qualified on pole in Sebring but did not finish due to mechanical issues and was 24th in Petit Le Mans.

Dixon competed in the 24 Hours of Daytona from 2010 to 2012, sharing the No. 2 Riley MkXX-BMW with Franchitti, Jamie McMurray, and Montoya. They finished 37th in 2010 due to mechanical failure, but finished second and fourth in 2011 and 2012, respectively. In July 2012, he, McMurray, and Montoya returned to the Rolex Sports Car Series for the three-hour Brickyard Grand Prix at Indianapolis in CGRFS' No. 2 car, finishing fourth. Although Dixon, Franchitti, Joey Hand and McMurray were 37th in the 2013 24 Hours of Daytona due to McMurray's accident following a pit stop, he and Franchitti were third in the Continental Tire Sports Car Festival. In 2014, he, Marino Franchitti, Kanaan, and Kyle Larson finished eighth in class and 15th overall in the 24 Hours of Daytona after mechanical issues, and sixth in the 12 Hours of Sebring with Kanaan and Sage Karam. Dixon joined Pruett and Rojas at the No. 1 team for the season-ending Petit Le Mans, finishing third.

He, Kanaan, Larson and McMurray won the 2015 24 Hours of Daytona, completing 740 laps in the No. 2 CGRFS Riley-Ford car. Dixon was paired with Hand and Pruett to CGRFS's No. 1 lineup for both the 12 Hours of Sebring and the Petit Le Mans, finishing fourth in both races. Dixon was joined by Kanaan, Larson, and McMurray for the 2016 24 Hours of Daytona; brake issues caused Larson to crash, leaving the No. 2 car 13th overall. He raced Ford CGR's No. 67 Ford GT alongside Ryan Briscoe and Richard Westbrook in the 12 Hours of Sebring and the Petit Le Mans as well as the No. 69 car in the Le Mans Grand Touring Endurance Professional (LMGTE Pro) 24 Hours of Le Mans for the next three years. The trio's best Le Mans LMGTE Pro class finish was third in 2016, and they won the GTLM category of the 2018 24 Hours of Daytona after 783 laps.

In 2020, he entered the 24 Hours of Daytona, this time with Wayne Taylor Racing (WTR). The No. 10 Cadillac DPi-V.R he shared with Briscoe, Kamui Kobayashi and Renger van der Zande won in a record-breaking 833 laps. Dixon finished 16th overall in the  Bathurst 12 Hour with R-Motorsport's No. 76 Pro class Aston Martin Vantage AMR GT3 he shared with Jake Dennis and Rick Kelly one week later. He, Briscoe and Van Der Zande won the Petit Le Mans and were seventh in the 12 Hours of Sebring with WTR. Dixon finished fifth in both the 24 Hours of Daytona and the 12 Hours of Sebring in 2021, driving the No. 1 Cadillac CGR DPi-V.R with Kevin Magnussen and Van Der Zande. He, Earl Bamber and Van Der Zande were fifth in the season-ending Petit Le Mans. In the 2022 24 Hours of Daytona, he finished seventh in class and 14th overall in the No. 1 car alongside Sébastien Bourdais, Palou, and Van Der Zande; he missed the 12 Hours of Sebring because of an IndyCar commitment at Texas and was replaced by Ryan Hunter-Reay. He finished fourth in the season-ending Petit Le Mans alongside Bourdais and Van Der Zande.

Dixon competed in the 2023 24 Hours of Daytona as a co-driver in the No. 1 Cadillac V-LHDh car with Bourdais and Van Der Zande, finishing third overall.

Other racing ventures
Dixon was one of twelve drivers invited to compete in the four-race IROC stock car racing series in 2004, driving an identically prepared Pontiac Firebird. He finished in the bottom half of the top ten in all four races and finished the season in tenth place in the points standings with 25 points. Dixon joined Kelly Racing as Todd Kelly's international co-driver in the No. 7 Holden VE Commodore for the 2010 V8 Supercar Championship Series' Armor All Gold Coast 600 double header event, finishing 20th in the first race and crashing in the second.

The tests did not result in Dixon being signed to the Williams team in either a testing or a racing capacity because it was uninterested in employing a rookie.

Driving style 
The Race's Matt Beer and Jack Benyon write that Dixon is consistent not "in the boring sense of hanging back in third and fourth while others screw up" but rather "in the sense of always maximising what's possible amid the often crazy circumstances of IndyCar races" that "Rival after rival has discovered how hard it is to shake Dixon off in a title fight, no matter what degree of plight he seems to be in during any given race." According to Racer's Jeff Olson, Dixon prefers to drive a car with oversteer for better driveability, and racing journalist Marshall Pruett observes the driver's ability to perform 100 micro-corrections with the steering wheel during each lap. David Malsher-Lopez of Motorsport.com characterised Dixon's handling style as not proactive but "reactive, a reflex match with the vagaries of car handling and physics." He can save more fuel than other drivers while driving faster because he requests information when each of his stints begins and operates within the limits of his given fuel mileage number, allowing him to make fewer or faster pit stops.

Non-racing ventures and recognition

He is an ambassador for the youth cancer patients' support group CanTeen and Teen Cancer America because he feels teenagers with cancer as a group are overlooked. Dixon is also an ambassador for the Richard Mille watch maker, and supports CGR's Women in Motorsport initiative because he is the father of two daughters and believes women in an IndyCar team could improve performance. He has done business with the US division of the New Zealand appliance manufacturer Fisher & Paykel, and has fundraised for children's charities. He and his wife were honorary co-chairs of IndyHumane's annual Mutt Strut dog walk fundraiser at the Indianapolis Motor Speedway in April 2019.

Dixon has been a director of Concept Motorsport New Zealand since 2012. He appeared on the Late Show with David Letterman three times. Dixon was a guest on the 28 May 2008 edition of Live With Regis and Kelly, and was the subject of This Is Your Life on 21 September 2008. In July 2017, he appeared on Jay Leno's Garage, and his life and 2017 IndyCar season were the subject of the 2018 Bryn Evans documentary Born Racer.

Dixon was awarded the Jim Clark Trophy in 1999, 2001, 2004, and 2019 "for the New Zealand driver competing at a National or higher level who shows a sportsmanlike attitude to the sport and fellow competitors and natural ability in "putting up the most meritorious racing performance during the season" and the Bruce McLaren Trophy in 2003 and 2008. In the 2009 New Year Honours, he was made a Member of the New Zealand Order of Merit and was appointed Companion of the New Zealand Order of Merit in the 2019 Queen's Birthday Honours, both for "for services to motorsport". Dixon was named New Zealand's Sportsman of the Year in 2008 and 2013 and was nominated in 2003, 2009, 2015, 2018 and 2021. 

NZ Post issued the New Zealand Champions of World Motorsport stamp series featuring him and four other New Zealand motor racing champions in early 2009. Dixon was inducted into the MotorSport New Zealand Wall of Fame in 2009 and the Road to Indy Hall of Fame in 2014. In July 2013, he was named by Autosport magazine as one of the 50 greatest drivers to have never raced in F1. Joe Hogsett, the Mayor of Indianapolis, recognised Dixon's motor racing achievements by declaring 24 September 2018 "Scott Dixon Day" in Indianapolis.

Career results

American open–wheel racing results
(key) (Races in bold indicate pole position; races in italics indicate fastest lap.)

Indy Lights

CART

IndyCar Series

* Season still in progress.
 1 Races run on same day
 2 The 2011 IZOD IndyCar World Championship was abandoned after Dan Wheldon died from injuries sustained in a 15-car crash on lap 11.
 3 Dixon won the title on the tiebreak—he won three races to Juan Pablo Montoya's two after both tied on 556 points.

Indianapolis 500

Sports car racing

Complete American Le Mans Series results

Rolex Sports Car Series results
(key) (Races in bold indicate pole position) (Races in italics indicate fastest lap) (Results indicate class finishing position)

Complete IMSA SportsCar Championship results
(key) (Races in bold indicate pole position) (Races in italics indicate fastest lap) (Results indicate class finishing position)

* Season still in progress.

24 Hours of Daytona results

24 Hours of Le Mans results

12 Hours of Bathurst results

V8 Supercar Championship results
(key) (Races in bold indicate pole position) (Races in italics indicate fastest lap)

† Not Eligible for points

International Race of Champions
(key) (Bold – Pole position. * – Most laps led.)

Notes

References

External links

 
 
 
 

1980 births
24 Hours of Daytona drivers
24 Hours of Le Mans drivers
American Le Mans Series drivers
Champ Car drivers
Companions of the New Zealand Order of Merit
Formula Ford drivers
Formula Holden drivers
Indianapolis 500 drivers
Indianapolis 500 polesitters
Indianapolis 500 winners
Indy Lights champions
Indy Lights drivers
IndyCar Series champions
IndyCar Series drivers
International Race of Champions drivers
Living people
New Zealand racing drivers
New Zealand expatriates in the United States
New Zealand expatriate sportspeople in Australia
People educated at James Cook High School
Racing drivers from Brisbane
Rolex Sports Car Series drivers
Sportspeople from Auckland
Supercars Championship drivers
WeatherTech SportsCar Championship drivers
American Spirit Team Johansson drivers
PacWest Racing drivers
Chip Ganassi Racing drivers
R-Motorsport drivers
Multimatic Motorsports drivers
Aston Martin Racing drivers
Wayne Taylor Racing drivers
Kelly Racing drivers